Rosa azerbaidshanica is an endemic species of rose, found only in Kalbajar Rayon of Azerbaijan.

References

azerbaidshanica
Endemic flora of Azerbaijan
Flora of Azerbaijan
Plants described in 1947